Newry is a resort town in Oxford County, Maine, United States.  The population was 411 at the 2020 census. Newry was the site of one of Maine's worst Cold War aircraft crashes. The town is the home of Sunday River Ski Resort and has a proportionately large seasonal (winter) population.

History

First called Sunday River Plantation, it was settled in 1781 by Benjamin Barker and his two brothers from Methuen, Massachusetts, together with Ithiel Smith of Cape Elizabeth. But the settlement was plundered in 1782 by Indians and abandoned. Then John J. Holmes of New Jersey purchased the land in 1794 with his sister's surname on the deed: Bostwick. On June 15, 1805, Bostwick Plantation was renamed by settlers that had come from Newry in what is now Northern Ireland. The name Newry is an anglicization of An Iúraigh, an oblique form of An Iúrach, which means "the grove of yew trees".

The trade route (now Route 26) from Portland to Errol, New Hampshire, completed in 1802, passed through Newry. Farms were established on the intervales, which had excellent soil. Hay was the principal crop. Slopes of the mountains provided pasturage for grazing animals. A sawmill and gristmill were built on the Bear River, and by 1870 the population was 416. Today, Newry is noted as the home of Sunday River Ski Resort.

1960 KC-97 tanker crash

At 20:15, 27 June 1960, a United States Air Force tanker of the 380th Air Refueling Squadron departed Plattsburgh AFB to refuel a Strategic Air Command bomber.  The Boeing KC-97 Stratofreighter rendezvoused with the B-47 Stratojet bomber at an altitude of 15,500 feet in the Fighting Fox aerial refueling area over Newry.  As the bomber maneuvered into refueling position, a lubrication failure caused the tanker's outboard port engine supercharger impeller to disintegrate.  Impeller fragments leaving the engine nacelle caused fuel leakage.  The bomber observed ignition of the leaking fuel and broke away from formation.  The tanker entered a gradual left turn which became a spiraling spin as the fire rapidly caused structural damage to the port wing.  Seven miles away, three hundred people at a Rumford Point drive-in theater observed the tanker spin down with burning pieces flying off.  The fuselage impacted a forested slope of granite boulders and caused a fireball seen fifty miles away in Lewiston, Maine.  The port wing tip was found in Howard Pond three miles from the crash site.  There were no survivors from the tanker's five-man crew.  Wet vegetation limited spread of the fire, but fuel covered trees were completely consumed and the five acre hillside wreckage field was discernible for years amid the surrounding forest.

Newry murders

The February 23, 2012, episode of Sins and Secrets (season 2, episode 7, "Newry") told the story of a series of murders that happened at a local B&B in 2006.  The convicted killer, charged in 2006 and now serving four consecutive life sentences, was a citizen of Newry.

Geography
Newry is drained by the Bear River and Sunday River, which both flow into the Androscoggin River.

Demographics

2010 census
As of the census of 2010, there were 329 people, 157 households, and 93 families living in the town. The racial makeup of the town was 97.3% White, 1.2% Native American, and 1.5% from two or more races. Hispanic or Latino of any race were 0.9% of the population.

There were 157 households, of which 17.8% had children under the age of 18 living with them, 52.9% were married couples living together, 3.8% had a female householder with no husband present, 2.5% had a male householder with no wife present, and 40.8% were non-families. Of all households 30.6% were made up of individuals, and 8.9% had someone living alone who was 65 years of age or older. The average household size was 2.10 and the average family size was 2.62.

The median age in the town was 49.9 years. 14.6% of residents were under the age of 18; 6.6% were between the ages of 18 and 24; 20.1% were from 25 to 44; 41.3% were from 45 to 64; and 17.3% were 65 years of age or older. The gender makeup of the town was 53.2% male and 46.8% female.

2000 census
As of the census of 2000, there were 344 people, 142 households, and 90 families living in the town.  The population density was 5.6 people per square mile (2.2/km).  There were 1,075 housing units at an average density of 17.5 per square mile (6.8/km).  The racial makeup of the town was 98.26% White, 0.87% Native American, 0.29% Asian, and 0.58% from two or more races.

There were 142 households, out of which 30.3% had children under the age of 18 living with them, 50.0% were married couples living together, 5.6% had a female householder with no husband present, and 36.6% were non-families. Of all households 23.9% were made up of individuals, and 4.9% had someone living alone who was 65 years of age or older.  The average household size was 2.42 and the average family size was 2.96.

In the town, the population was spread out, with 25.0% under the age of 18, 7.8% from 18 to 24, 25.9% from 25 to 44, 30.5% from 45 to 64, and 10.8% who were 65 years of age or older.  The median age was 41 years. For every 100 females, there were 108.5 males.  For every 100 females age 18 and over, there were 111.5 males.

The median income for a household in the town was $42,321, and the median income for a family was $51,250. Males had a median income of $37,500 versus $19,625 for females. The per capita income for the town was $21,982.  About 3.8% of families and 5.0% of the population were below the poverty line, including 2.2% of those under age 18 and 12.5% of those age 65 or over.

Sites of interest
 Artists' Covered Bridge (1872)
 Step Falls Preserve
 Sunday River Ski Resort
 Grafton Notch State Park, just north of town

See also 
 Persis Foster Eames Albee, the very first "Avon Lady", was born here

References

External links

 Town of Newry, Maine
 Maine Genealogy: Newry, Oxford County, Maine
 Sunday River Ski Resort

 
Towns in Oxford County, Maine
Towns in Maine
Resort towns